The 2001 European Karate Championships, the 36th edition, was held in Sofia, Bulgaria from May 11 to 13, 2001.

Medallists

Men's competition

Individual

Team

Women's competition

Individual

Team

Medagliere

References

External links
 Karate Records - European Championship 2001

2001
International sports competitions hosted by Bulgaria
European Karate Championships
European championships in 2001
Sports competitions in Sofia
2000s in Sofia
Karate competitions in Bulgaria
May 2001 sports events in Europe